The Ministry of Parliamentary Affairs is the member of the Government of Portugal responsible for its relations with the Assembly of the Republic and other parliamentary groups.

External links
Official page of the Government of Portugal

Parliamentary Affairs
Parliamentary affairs ministries